Fathom is a 2021 American documentary film, directed by Drew Xanthopoulos. It follows two researchers of humpback whales who study their communication and how it evolves across oceans and continents.

It had its world premiere at the Tribeca Film Festival on June 16, 2021. It was released on June 25, 2021, by Apple TV+.

Synopsis

Release
In April 2021, Apple TV+ acquired worldwide distribution rights to the film, and set it for a June 25, 2021, release. It had its world premiere at the Tribeca Film Festival on June 16, 2021. It also screened at AFI DOCS on June 23, 2021.

Critical reception
Fathom holds a 50% approval rating on review aggregator website Rotten Tomatoes, based on 16 reviews, with a weighted average of 7/10.  On Metacritic, the film holds a rating of 67 out of 100, based on eight critics, indicating "generally favorable reviews".

References

External links

2021 documentary films
2021 films
American documentary films
Apple TV+ original films
2020s English-language films
2020s American films